The Archway is the official newspaper of Bryant University, founded in 1946. The newspaper has been independent of Bryant University since the 1970s, and is completely run by undergraduate students. However, several prominent publishers, journalists, faculty, and staff members act as advisors to The Archway and assist in syndicating those stories across larger mediums. The newspaper is published biweekly during the semester on Thursdays.
Older editions of The Archway are available in Bryant's institutional repository.

References

External links
Bryant's institutional repository

Bryant University
Student newspapers published in Rhode Island
Newspapers established in 1946